The blotched forest skink (Sphenomorphus praesignis)  is a species of skink found in Thailand and Malaysia.

References

praesignis
Reptiles described in 1900
Taxa named by George Albert Boulenger